R.C. Gamble Jr. (born September 27, 1946) is a former American football running back in the American Football League who played for the Boston Patriots. He played college football for the South Carolina State Bulldogs. He also played in the Canadian Football League for the Saskatchewan Roughriders and Edmonton Eskimos.

References

1946 births
Living people
American football running backs
Boston Patriots players
Saskatchewan Roughriders players
Edmonton Elks players
South Carolina State Bulldogs football players
Canadian football running backs